The Mid-Delaware Bridge, sometimes known as the Port Jervis–Matamoras Bridge or the Fourth Barrett Bridge, is a continuous truss bridge which carries U.S. Routes 6 and 209 across that river between those two communities and thus the states of New York and Pennsylvania. Although it did have 4-Lanes at one point in its life, it only has 2-Lanes as of today.

History

The current bridge, built by R.C. Ritz Construction Company in 1939 at a cost of $380,000, is the most recent in a long history of crossings between the two communities. It began in the mid-19th century, when the local Milford and Matamoras Railroad settled a dispute with the larger, growing Erie Railroad with the latter's assent to a law requiring that it construct a bridge across the Delaware at Matamoras that could carry both road and rail traffic. It was supposed to have been completed by 1852, but due to the railroad's unsuccessful efforts to have the law requiring the bridge declared unconstitutional it only began building it that year. It was finished in 1854.

In 1870 that bridge was destroyed in a storm. Directors of the Milford and Matamoras confronted Jay Gould about this in New York when the Erie showed no apparent interest in immediately rebuilding it. He told them the railroad had sold its interest in the bridge to another company, which turned out to be a dummy corporation.  A new railroad bridge was built upstream.

Port Jervis businessmen led by Charles St. John frustrated by the delays formed the Barrett Bridge Company to build a suspension bridge designed by John A. Roebling. The bridge which had two spans of  opened in 1872. In March 1875 an ice dam on the Delaware upstream broke and in the ensuing flood, it took out the newly built railroad bridge above the Barrett Bridge. They were carted back and reassembled within a few weeks.

It lasted until its destruction in the severe flood of October 1903. A new Barrett Bridge was built shortly thereafter, using a design similar to the current bridge. In 1922 it was taken over by the new Joint Interstate Bridge Commission set up by the two states to manage their Delaware River bridges; tolls were eliminated.

The Barrett Bridge lasted until October 18, 1939, when a new bridge crossing the span was completed. Two lanes of the new bridge opened on October 9. Demolition of the old bridge began that same day and lasted through November 26. 

It would be the only crossing in the area until Interstate 84 was completed in the 1960s with a bridge less than a mile downstream. The Mid-Delaware has proven hardier than its predecessors, standing firm through the post-hurricane flooding in 1955. However, it was closed during the 2006 flooding due to the river waters overrunning its approach roads on either side.

In June 2007, the Commission approved $550,000 worth of work to be completed in 2008. The abutment backwalls on both sides, and the pier expansion dam, will be repaired.

See also
 List of crossings of the Delaware River
 New York–Pennsylvania Joint Interstate Bridge Commission

References

Bridges over the Delaware River
Bridges in Orange County, New York
Bridges in Pike County, Pennsylvania
Bridges completed in 1939
Continuous truss bridges in the United States
Steel bridges in the United States
Road bridges in New York (state)
Road bridges in Pennsylvania
Bridges of the United States Numbered Highway System
U.S. Route 6
Former toll bridges in New York (state)
Former toll bridges in Pennsylvania
Port Jervis, New York
U.S. Route 9
New York–Pennsylvania Joint Interstate Bridge Commission